The Ike Hamilton Expo Center is a 2,900-seat multipurpose, indoor arena located in West Monroe, Louisiana.  It is used primarily for rodeos and horse shows; however, in keeping with the arena's name, it can also be used for conventions, dog agility trials, and trade shows.  The arena contains  of floor space.  The arena also contains meeting rooms and concession facilities, as well as an adjacent horse barn with 510 stalls and two warm-up areas.

Most, if not all, events at Ike Hamilton Expo Center are free events.  The exceptions are concerts, selected sporting events, and other paid admission events that, combined with revenue for the concessions, help support the arena financially.  The arena also derives its revenue from the nearby RV area.  It takes two years for a typical event booked at the Ike to be held as scheduled, in contrast to most arenas.

The center was built under the administration of Mayor Dave Norris, who has held the office since 1978.

See also
 List of convention centers in the United States

References

External links
Ike Hamilton Expo Center at westmonroe.com

Indoor arenas in Louisiana
Convention centers in Louisiana
Sports venues in Monroe, Louisiana
Sports venues in Louisiana
Music venues in Louisiana
Rodeo venues in the United States